is a Japanese physician and oncologist specializing in molecular diagnosis and novel medical treatment of cancer. He is well known for the discovery of a melanoma-related antigen (later, it is called, Chondroitin Sulfate Proteoglycan-4 (CSPG4)) by producing a monoclonal antibody. In addition, he produced monoclonal antibodies against CEA or ICAM-1  and found out they are usable in the diagnosis and the pathological analysis.

He is a former professor and president of Sapporo Medical University. He was a Council Member of the Science Council of Japan (The 20th and 21st term). Also he was invited by the Emperor and Empress to their spring garden party in 2009. He was a professor and the director at Research Hospital, The Institute of Medical Science, the University of Tokyo in 2010 and is currently a project professor at the University of Tokyo and the director of Kanagawa Cancer Center Research Institute in 2014 to present. He received the Medal of Honor with Purple Ribbon in 2013.

Contribution

Imai discovered three kinds of protein tyrosine phosphatase (PTP) genes having the function of controlling the signal transduction of cancer cells. His research on the treatment with siRNA targeting PRDM14 molecule expressed in cancer cells is soon to be clinically applied to patients in Japan.　Further, he developed the diagnostic method of a digestive tract cancer utilizing a methylation of genes expressed in cancer cells.

Biography and career

Imai was born in Hakodate, Hokkaido in 1948. After receiving MD from Sapporo Medical College in 1972, he started his career at the Department of Internal Medicine (Division I) under the supervision of Professor Takeo Wada. He obtained his Ph.D. from Sapporo Medical College in 1976. He worked at The Scripps Research Institute under the supervision of Prof. RA Reisfeld and Prof S Ferrone, as a NIH post-doctoral research fellow 1978 to 1981. Upon returning to Japan, he obtained the post of lecturer at the Department of Internal Medicine (Division I) of Sapporo Medical University where he later promoted to an associate professor and to a professor in 1994. During the period, he had been to the United Kingdom to study under Professor César Milstein (Nobel Prize Laureate) at MRC Laboratory of Molecular Biology, the University of Cambridge in 1985. He was appointed to the 9th chairperson of Sapporo Medical University in 2004. Later on he was appointed to the first president of Sapporo Medical University which has been transformed from a prefectural university to a prefectural university corporation in accordance with the Local Independent Administrative Agency Act in 2007. He was appointed to a professor and the director at Research Hospital, The Institute of Medical Science, the University of Tokyo in 2010. He later appointed to the director of Center for Antibody and Vaccine Therapy, the Institute of Medical Science, the University of Tokyo in 2012. From 2014 to the present, he has been a project professor at Tokyo University, the head of Medical Innovation Promotion Office, and the director of Kanagawa Cancer Center Research Institute.

References

 
 
 
 
 

Cancer researchers
People from Hakodate
Academic staff of the University of Tokyo
1948 births
Living people
Recipients of the Medal with Purple Ribbon